The John Bickford House is a historic late First Period house in North Reading, Massachusetts.  The c. 1735 two-story timber-frame house has relatively conservative First Period features despite its somewhat (comparatively) late construction date, which may be due to John Bickford's strong connections with nearby Salem.  Its timber frame and central chimney are conservative in design, but the building also has Georgian paneling on the interior, and, unusual for the period, a gambrel-style roof.

The house was added to the National Register of Historic Places in 1990.

See also
National Register of Historic Places listings in Middlesex County, Massachusetts

References

Houses on the National Register of Historic Places in Middlesex County, Massachusetts
North Reading, Massachusetts